Courier Mail may refer to:
The Courier-Mail, an Australian newspaper
Courier Mail Server, a mail-server software suite
Courier (email client), email client software
Courier, an accelerated mail delivery service for which the customer pays a surcharge and receives faster delivery